Simone Petrangeli (born 8 June 1975) is an Italian politician and Lawyer. He is member of the Left Ecology Freedom.He was born in Rome, Italy. He has been the Mayor of Rieti from 2013 until 2017.

References

External links 

|-

Living people
1975 births
Politicians from Rome
Left Ecology Freedom politicians
21st-century Italian politicians
21st-century Italian lawyers
Mayors of places in Lazio
People from Rieti